The 2021 Campeones Cup was the third edition of the Campeones Cup, an annual North American football match contested between the champions of the previous Major League Soccer season and the winner of the Campeón de Campeones from Liga MX.

The match featured Columbus Crew, winners of the 2020 MLS Cup, and Cruz Azul, winners of the 2021 Campeón de Campeones. The Crew hosted the match at their home stadium, Lower.com Field in Columbus, Ohio. It was played on September 29, 2021.

Match

Details

Statistics

References

External links

2021
2021 in American soccer
2021–22 in Mexican football
2021 in sports in Ohio
21st century in Columbus, Ohio
September 2021 sports events in the United States
Cruz Azul matches
Columbus Crew matches